Anne Pryke is a Jersey politician who was first elected as a Deputy for Trinity in the Jersey general election of 2005.

Political career
Pryke was re-elected as Health and Social Services Minister in November 2011.

References

Living people
Deputies of Jersey
Government ministers of Jersey
Jersey women in politics
21st-century British women politicians
Women government ministers of Jersey
Year of birth missing (living people)